The Australian Oriental Line was a shipping company that operated between Sydney, Japan and Hong Kong. It was formed in 1912 by G.S. Yuill & Company. The company closed in 1961 due to the high costs of acquiring new vessels or refitting the existing fleet.

Ships of the Australian Oriental Line

Notes

Defunct shipping companies of Australia
Maritime history of Australia
Australian companies established in 1912
1961 disestablishments in Australia